Tallinn Sports Hall is a sport hall in Tallinn, Estonia.

The hall was opened on 11 February 1996 and at that time, it was the most modern athletics facility in the Baltics, with a 200-metre running lane, several tennis courts, basketball hall, and a fitness studio.

References

Sports venues in Tallinn